Downies is a cliff-top village in Aberdeenshire, Scotland situated on Cammachmore Bay.  Historically Downies was a fishing village, until much of the local North Sea fishery collapsed from overfishing; presently Downies is chiefly a residential dormitory adjunct to the city of Aberdeen.

Local area history
The local area of Downies was first recorded in medieval history in association with the Causey Mounth.  Downies is positioned somewhat east with respect to the ancient Causey Mounth trackway, which route was constructed on high ground to render this only available medieval route from coastal points south from Stonehaven to Aberdeen. This passage specifically connected the River Dee crossing (where the present Bridge of Dee is situated) via Portlethen Moss, Muchalls Castle and Stonehaven to the south. The route was that taken by William Keith, 7th Earl Marischal and the Marquess of Montrose when they led a Covenanter army of 9000 soldiers in the first battle of the Civil War in the year 1639.

See also
 Craigmaroinn
 Findon
 May Craig
 Portlethen
 Portlethen Village

References

Villages in Aberdeenshire